Yellowstone is a 1936 American crime film set in Yellowstone National Park, directed by Arthur Lubin and released by Universal Studios.

The film, starring Judith Barrett, Henry Hunter, Ralph Morgan, Alan Hale, Raymond Hatton, and Andy Devine, combines murder mystery, romance, and natural setting. The famous historic building Old Faithful Inn is featured in the film.

Premise
An ex-con is murdered in Yellowstone National Park while a bank robber's son is searching for the loot his father hid there 20 years before.

Cast
 Henry Hunter as Dick Sherwood
 Judith Barrett as Ruth Foster
 Andy Devine as Pay-Day
 Alan Hale as Hardigan
 Ralph Morgan as James Foster
 Monroe Owsley as Marty Ryan
 Rollo Lloyd as Franklin Ross
 Raymond Hatton as Old Pete
 Paul Harvey as Radell
 Paul Fix as Dynamite
 Michael Loring as Merritt Billing

Production
Filming started June 1936 with the majority taking place in the studio, with very little outdoor filming taking place in the national park.

Soundtrack
 Unknown singer and the Universal Recording Orchestra - "From the Land of the Sky-Blue Water" (Music by Charles Wakefield Cadman, lyrics by Nelle Richmond Eberhart)
 Michael Loring - "Joggin' Along" (Music by Irving Actman, lyrics by Frank Loesser)

Reception
The Christian Science Monitor called it "an inferior mystery story".

Diabolique called it "a decent thriller notable for its weak leads, robust support cast and incorporation of location photography at Yellowstone National Park."

Lubin called the film "horrible", one of what he considered the "eight flops" in his career.

In Grand Design, Tino Balio writes that "set in the national park, [it] wastes its scenic opportunities through unconvincing rear projection and cramped studio shots unimaginatively directed by Arthur Lubin.

References

External links 

Yellowstone at Letterbox DVD

1936 films
American mystery films
1930s English-language films
American black-and-white films
Films directed by Arthur Lubin
1930s mystery films
American crime drama films
1936 crime drama films
1930s American films
Films set in the Yellowstone National Park